The 2005–06 CERH European League was the 41st edition of the CERH European League organized by CERH. Its Final Four was held in May 2007 in Torres Novas, Portugal.

Preliminary round

|}

First round
The four eliminated teams with more points in the CERH ranking would be dropped to the 2005–06 CERS Cup.

|}

Group stage
In each group, teams played against each other home-and-away in a home-and-away round-robin format.

The two first qualified teams advanced to the Final Four.

Group A

Group B

Final four
The Final Four was played at the Palácio dos Desportos in Torres Novas, Portugal.

Follonica won its first continental title.

References

External links
 CERH website

2005 in roller hockey
2006 in roller hockey
Rink Hockey Euroleague